Donald Douglas Harington (December 22, 1935 – November 7, 2009) was an American author and visual artist. All but the first of his novels either take place in or have an important connection to "Stay More," a fictional Ozark Mountains town based somewhat on Drakes Creek, Arkansas, where Harington spent summers as a child.

Biography
Harington was born and raised in Little Rock, Arkansas. He lost nearly all of his hearing at age 12 due to meningitis. This did not prevent him from picking up and remembering the vocabulary and modes of expression among the Ozark denizens, nor in conducting his teaching career as an adult.

Though he intended to be a novelist from a very early age, his course of study and his teaching career were in art and art history. He taught art history in Millbrook, New York, Putney, Vermont, and South Dakota before returning to the University of Arkansas in Fayetteville, his alma mater, where he taught for 22 years before his retirement on May 1, 2008.

Entertainment Weekly called him "America's greatest unknown writer."  The novelist and critic Fred Chappell said of him "Donald Harington isn't an unknown writer. He's an undiscovered continent."  Novelist James Sallis, writing in the Boston Globe: "Harington's books are of a piece -- the quirkiest, most original body of work in contemporary U.S. letters."

Harington died of pneumonia, after a long illness, in Springdale on November 7, 2009.

His novels are available from The Toby Press in a uniform edition, with cover illustrations by Wendell Minor.

A 2013 biopic of Harington titled Stay More: The World of Donald Harington was created by filmmaker Brian Walter based upon interviews with Harington and his wife during 2006–2007, which was released in 2013 and is distributed by the University of Arkansas Press.

Novels 
The Cherry Pit (1965)
Lightning Bug (1970)
 Some Other Place. The Right Place. (1972), adapted into the film Return in 1985
The Architecture of the Arkansas Ozarks (1975)
The Cockroaches of Stay More (1989)
The Choiring of the Trees (1991)
Ekaterina (1993)
Butterfly Weed (1996)
When Angels Rest (1998)
Thirteen Albatrosses (or, Falling off the Mountain) (2002)
With (2003)
The Pitcher Shower (2005)
Farther Along (2008)
Enduring (2009)

Nonfiction 
On a Clear Day: The Paintings of George Dombek, 1975-1994 (1995)
Let Us Build Us a City: Eleven Lost Towns (1986)

Awards 
Oxford American Lifetime Award for Contributions to Southern Literature, 2006
Robert Penn Warren Award for Fiction, 2003
Arkansas Writers Hall of Fame, 1996
Porter Prize for Literary Excellence, 1987

References

External links
Author-endorsed Website (not currently maintained)
Biography and interview by Edwin T. (Chip) Arnold
Biographical article at the Encyclopedia of Arkansas History and Culture
"America's Undiscovered Continent" — article on his life and work
"Wry Stories and Word Music" — article on themes, techniques, and cultural background
"Donald Harington, Ozark Surrealist, Dies at 73"—NY Times obituary
"Donald Harington obituary"—From the Guardian

1935 births
2009 deaths
20th-century American novelists
21st-century American novelists
American male novelists
University of Arkansas alumni
Boston University alumni
University of Arkansas faculty
Deaf writers
Writers from Little Rock, Arkansas
Deaths from pneumonia in Arkansas
American deaf people
20th-century American male writers
21st-century American male writers